India participated and hosted the 1951 Asian Games held in the capital city , New Delhi from 4 to 11 March 1951. India was ranked second with 15 gold medals in this edition of the Asiad. Sachin Nag won a gold in swimming in this edition.

Medal table

Medal winner's

References

Nations at the 1951 Asian Games
1951
Asian Games